The 1998 Japanese Touring Car Championship was the 14th edition of the series. It began at Fuji Speedway on 5 April and finished after seven events, also at Fuji Speedway on 8 November. The championship was won for the second time by Masanori Sekiya, driving for Toyota Team TOM's.

Teams & Drivers

Calendar

Championship Standings

References

Touring Car Championship
Japanese Touring Car Championship seasons